Ding Yu may refer to 
Ding Yu (Ming dynasty), general who was executed by Zhu Yuanzhang
Ding Yu (painter)